Ruppen Pass (el. 1003 m.) is a high mountain pass between the cantons of St. Gallen and Appenzell Ausserrhoden in Switzerland.

It connects Trogen and Altstätten. The pass road has a maximum grade of 9 percent.

See also
 List of highest paved roads in Europe
 List of mountain passes
List of the highest Swiss passes

Ruppen
Mountain passes of the canton of St. Gallen
Appenzell Ausserrhoden–St. Gallen border